(+)-endo-α-Bergamotene synthase (EC 4.2.3.54, (2Z,6Z)-farnesyl diphosphate cyclizing) (SBS) is an enzyme with systematic name (2Z,6Z)-farnesyl diphosphate lyase (cyclizing; (+)-endo-α-bergamotene-forming). This enzyme catalyses the following chemical reaction

 (2Z,6Z)-farnesyl diphosphate  (–)-endo-α-bergamotene + diphosphate

The enzyme synthesizes a mixture of sesquiterpenoids from (2Z,6Z)-farnesyl diphosphate.

References

External links 
 

EC 4.2.3